The 2016–17 Belgian Cup, called the Croky Cup for sponsorship reasons, is the 62nd season of Belgium's annual football cup competition. The competition began on 30 July 2016 and is scheduled to end with the final in March 2017. The winners of the competition will qualify for the 2017–18 UEFA Europa League Group Stage. Standard Liège were the defending champions, but were eliminated in the 6th round by ASV Geel.

Competition format
The competition consists of ten rounds. Except for the semi-finals, all rounds are single-match elimination rounds. When tied after 90 minutes in the first three rounds, penalties are taken immediately. In rounds four to seven and the quarterfinals, when tied after 90 minutes first an extra time period of 30 minutes are played, then penalties are taken if still necessary. The semi-finals will be played over two legs, where the team winning on aggregate advances. The final will be played as a single match.

Teams enter the competition in different rounds, based upon their 2016–17 league affiliation. Teams from the fifth-level Belgian Third Amateur Division or lower began in round 1. Belgian Second Amateur Division teams entered in round 2, Belgian First Amateur Division teams entered in round 3, Belgian First Division B teams in round 5 and finally the Belgian First Division A teams enter in round 6.

Round and draw dates
The schedule is as follows.

First round
This round of matches was played on 30 & 31 July 2016  and includes teams playing in the Belgian Third Amateur Division and Belgian Provincial Leagues. Teams from the Belgian Third Amateur Division were seeded and could not play each other.

Four teams from the lowest division at level nine of the Belgian football pyramid participated, namely Hermalienne, Lacs de l'eau d'heure, Negenmanneke and Pulle. These all got eliminated.

Notes

Second round
The lowest ranked clubs still in the tournament were six teams from the third provincial level (level 8), of which only Ransartoise B managed to progress.

Notes

Third round
Ransartoise B was the lowest ranked team still in the tournament at this point being the only team from level 8, but they got eliminated by Ingelmunster.

Fourth round
The lowest ranked clubs in this round were five teams from level 6, namely Katelijne, Lochristi, Paturageois, Racing Waregem and Vlijtingen. They all failed to progress.

Fifth Round
Four teams from the Belgian Third Amateur Division (level 5) had managed to progress to this round but were all eliminated at this point: Francs Borains, Helchteren, Rebecq and Turnhout.

Sixth Round
The sixth round saw the entry of the Belgian First Division A teams. The matches were played on 20 and 21 September 2016.

Seventh Round

Quarter-finals
The matches were played on 13 and 14 December 2016.

Semi-finals
The semi-finals will be played over two legs, with the first legs played on 17 and 18 January 2017 and the second legs on 31 January and 1 February 2017.

First Legs

Second Legs

Final

The final took place on 18 March 2017 at the King Baudouin Stadium in Brussels.

References

Belgian Cup seasons
Belgian Cup
Cup